"Rock-a-Billy" is a popular song by Woody Harris and Eddie V. Deane, published in 1957. The song was popularized by Guy Mitchell in 1957.

Chart performance
Mitchell's recording (released as Columbia Records catalog number 40877) reached No. 10 on the Billboard Hot 100 chart in the United States, and No. 1 on the UK Singles Chart for one week in May 1957.

Cover versions
Billie Anthony also did a version of this song (Columbia Records – 45-DB 3935); album EMI presents the magic of Billie Anthony (EMI Gold – 7243 5 31996 2 3).

References

1957 songs
Songs written by Woody Harris
Guy Mitchell songs
UK Singles Chart number-one singles